Epieicidae or Epieikidai was a deme in ancient Attica of the phyle of Cecropis, sending one delegate to the Athenian Boule.. In 303/2 BCE and in 281/0 BCE, no delegates of Epieicidae attended the Boule.

Its site is unlocated.

References

Populated places in ancient Attica
Former populated places in Greece
Demoi
Lost ancient cities and towns